Prlekija is a region in northeastern Slovenia between the Drava and Mura rivers. It comprises the eastern part of the Slovene Hills, stretching from the border with Austria to the border with Croatia. It is part of the traditional province of Lower Styria. Together with the traditional province of Prekmurje, it forms part of the Mura Statistical Region. Its central town is Ljutomer.

The region is known for its first-class wines, food, and the specific dialect of its inhabitants, which has similarities to Prekmurje Slovene, with which it is mutually intelligible. The symbol of the region is the klopotec, a wooden mechanical device on a high wooden pole, similar to a windmill. Prleška tünka is a protected food product from Prlekija. It is made of minced lard and pork. Prlekija is also known by the pastry prleška gibanica, made of several layers and with a sweet filling.

The region comprises the municipalities of Križevci, Ljutomer, Radenci, Razkrižje, Sveti Jurij ob Ščavnici, Veržej, Gornja Radgona, Sveti Tomaž, Središče ob Dravi, and Ormož.

Notable people 
Notable people that were born or lived in the Prlekija region include the following:

Peter Dajnko, philologist 
Karol Grossmann, pioneering film maker
Vekoslav Grmič, theologian
Fran Ilešič, literary critic
Božidar Kantušer, composer
Anton Korošec, politician, prime minister of the Kingdom of Yugoslavia
Edvard Kocbek, poet and politician
Bratko Kreft, playwright
Franc Ksaver Meško, author
Vlado Miheljak, columnist
Franz Miklosich, linguist
Milan Osterc, football striker
Slavko Osterc, composer
Vika Potočnik, politician, former mayor of Ljubljana
Anton Trstenjak, painter
Anton Trstenjak, theologian and psychologist
Davorin Trstenjak, philologist and political activist
France Veber, philosopher
Stanko Vraz, Romantic poet

External links
 
 Prlekija-on.net 

Historical regions in Slovenia
Cultural regions
Geography of Styria (Slovenia)